Pool-in-Wharfedale or Pool in Wharfedale, usually abbreviated to Pool, is a village and civil parish in Lower Wharfedale, West Yorkshire, England,  north of Leeds city centre,  north-east of Bradford, and  east of Otley. It is in the City of Leeds metropolitan borough, and within the historic boundaries of the West Riding of Yorkshire.

Pool in Wharfedale is connected to the rest of West Yorkshire and surrounding areas by trunk roads and buses. It had a railway station, which linked the village to Leeds, until it closed as part of the Beeching Axe, but Weeton railway station is nearby. It had a population of 2,284 at the 2011 Census, up from 1,785 in 2001.

Pool is a scenic village and enjoys views in most directions, including The Chevin, the Arthington Viaduct and Almscliffe Crag. Running past the outskirts of Pool is the River Wharfe, which is prone to flooding. Nearby is Pool Bank, a steep hill.

The village amenities includes one pub, a post office, a garage, one primary school, a petrol station, a sports and social club with bar and the village hall. It also has two parks and miles of riverside walks.  The church of St Wilfred was rebuilt in 1839 on the site of a Chapel of Ease; its architect was Robert Dennis Chantrell.

There is a parish council, the lowest tier of local government.

In recent years the village has rapidly increased in size with the construction of many new homes.

On 5 July 2014, the Tour de France Stage 1 from Leeds to Harrogate passed through the village.

History 
The history of Pool-in-Wharfedade is well documented with an archive held by Pool Parish Council. It is mentioned in the Domesday Book as Pouele in the Liberty of Otley.

In 1881 the diarist John Dickinson wrote: "The people down at Pool are chiefly poor working people who are dependent on the paper mill and stone quarry and those trades are very bad just now.  But there are several gentlemen's residences occupied by retired tradesmen from Leeds."

Gallery

Location grid

See also
Listed buildings in Pool-in-Wharfedale

References

External links

 

Villages in West Yorkshire
Places in Leeds
Wharfedale
Civil parishes in West Yorkshire